The Tide is the debut album by American singer-songwriter Lucy Kaplansky, released in 1994.

Red House Records released a remastered version on October 4, 2005, including two bonus tracks.

Track listing 
 "The Tide" (Lucy Kaplansky, Richard Litvin) – 4:15
 "When I Get to the Border" (Richard Thompson) – 2:57
 "Texas Blues" (Bill Morrissey) – 2:47
 "The Heart" (Tom Russell, Greg Trooper) – 3:34
 "My Name Joe" (David Massengill) – 5:02
 "Somebody's Home" (Kaplansky) – 3:37
 "Guinevere" (Robin Batteau) – 4:17
 "Delivery Truck" (George Gerdes, Mark Johnson) – 3:06
 "You Just Need a Home" (Kaplansky) – 3:50
 "The Eyes of My Beholder" (Batteau) – 3:02
 "Secret Journey" (Sting) – 2:35
 "Goodnight" (Cliff Eberhardt) – 3:17
 "Everybody Knows But Me" (Jesse Winchester) – 2:14 (remastered edition)
 "I've Just Seen a Face" (John Lennon, Paul McCartney) – 3:13 (remastered edition)

Personnel
Lucy Kaplansky – vocals, guitar, background vocals
Larry Campbell – guitar, fiddle, dobro, mandolin, pedal steel guitar, Cittern, guitar
Anton Sanko – organ, lap steel guitar
Charlie Giordano – accordion
Drew Zingg – guitar
Michael Visceglia – bass
Roly Salley – bass, background vocals
Shawn Colvin – guitar, background vocals
Richard Shindell – background vocals
Kenneth Blevins – drums, percussion
Frank Vilardi – percussion
Production notes:
Anton Sanko – producer, mixing
Dennis McNerney – engineer
Geoff Keehn – engineer
David Glasser – mastering
Linda Beauvais – art direction
Irene Young – photography

References 

1994 debut albums
Lucy Kaplansky albums
Red House Records albums